Lars van Meijel (born 12 June 1994) is a Dutch professional golfer who plays on the Challenge Tour. He won the 2019 Open de Provence.

Amateur career
Van Meijel was a member of the Dutch National Team, and represented the Netherlands  three times at the European Boys' Team Championship 2010–2012 and four times at the European Amateur Team Championship 2013–2016. He also played in the Eisenhower Trophy twice, 2014 in Japan and 2016 in Mexico.

In 2012, Van Meijel won the Gran Premio Padova, reached the quarterfinals of the Italian Amateur, and played the Talihade Cup in Argentina. In 2013, he won both the Trompbeker (Dutch National U21 Stroke Play Championship) at the Noord-Nederlandse Golf Club and the Dutch National Stroke Play Championship at Golfclub Houtrak. In June 2014, he won the Brabants Open, which earned him a spot in the KLM Open.

In 2013, Van Meijel enrolled at the University of Memphis and started playing with the Memphis Tigers men's golf team. He won his first college golf tournament, the Shoal Creek Invitational, and his third tournament, the Bridgestone Collegiate. In 2016, he became only the fourth player within the Memphis men's golf program to earn Golf Coaches Association of American (GCAA) Division I All-America honors, joining Hillman Robbins (1954), Greg Powers (1969), and Steve Metz (1986) as All-Americans. He crowned his college career by winning the 2016 Arnold Palmer Cup.

Professional career
At the end of 2016, Van Meijel turned professionals and joined 2017 Alps Tour. After a fourth place in his first tournament, he won his second tournament in Egypt. After six further top-10s, he finished in fourth place in the ranking, and was promoted to the 2018 Challenge Tour. In 2019, he won the Open de Provence and finished in 19th place in the ranking. He earned his European Tour card at Qualifying School just months after securing his maiden Challenge Tour win. 

He struggled to make an impact on the European Tour and finished ranked 154th in 2020 and 174th in 2021.

Amateur wins
2012 Gran Premio Padova
2013 Dutch National U21 Stroke Play Championship, Dutch National Stroke Play Championship, Graeme McDowell Shoal Creek Invitational, Bridgestone Collegiate
2014 Dutch Brabants Open
2015 Pinetree Intercollegiate

Source:

Professional wins (3)

Challenge Tour wins (1)

Alps Tour wins (2)

Results in major championships

"T" = tied

Team appearances
Amateur
European Boys' Team Championship (representing the Netherlands): 2010, 2011, 2012
European Amateur Team Championship (representing the Netherlands): 2013, 2014, 2015
Eisenhower Trophy (representing the Netherlands): 2014, 2016
Arnold Palmer Cup (representing Europe): 2016 (winners)

See also
2019 European Tour Qualifying School graduates

References

External links

Dutch male golfers
European Tour golfers
Memphis Tigers men's golfers
Sportspeople from Eindhoven
1994 births
Living people
21st-century Dutch people